Perileptus is a genus of beetles in the family Carabidae, containing the following species:

 Perileptus africanus Jeannel, 1926
 Perileptus areolatus Creutzer, 1799
 Perileptus asahanai Ueno, 1974
 Perileptus barberae Ortuno, 1991
 Perileptus birmanicus Jeannel, 1930
 Perileptus boettcheri (Jedlicka, 1935)
 Perileptus cameroni Jeannel, 1923
 Perileptus ceylanicus (Nietner, 1857)
 Perileptus columbus Darlington, 1934
 Perileptus constrictipes (Sloane, 1896)
 Perileptus convexicollis Mateu, 1982
 Perileptus cylindricollis Baehr, 1997
 Perileptus cylindriformis Ueno, 1977
 Perileptus darlingtoni Casale & Laneyrie, 1989
 Perileptus davidsoni Deuve, 1989
 Perileptus denticollis Jeannel, 1923
 Perileptus dentifer Darlington, 1935
 Perileptus grandicollis Ueno & Yin, 1993
 Perileptus hamoni Jeannel, 1953
 Perileptus hesperidum Jeannel, 1925
 Perileptus humidus Coquerel, 1866
 Perileptus imaicus Jeannel, 1923
 Perileptus indicus Jeannel, 1923
 Perileptus japonicus Bates, 1873
 Perileptus jeanneli Darlington, 1934
 Perileptus jedlickai Ueno, 1976
 Perileptus jelineki Muilwijk & Felix, 2008
 Perileptus larueei Jeannel, 1938
 Perileptus laticeps Ueno, 1955
 Perileptus latimargo G.Muller, 1939
 Perileptus ledouxi Deuve, 2004
 Perileptus leleupi Basilewsky, 1951
 Perileptus madecassus Fairmaire, 1898
 Perileptus mameti Jeannel, 1946
 Perileptus melas Jeannel, 1926
 Perileptus mesasiaticus Ueno, 1976
 Perileptus microps Andrewes, 193
 Perileptus minimus Baehr, 1987
 Perileptus minutus Darlington, 1935
 Perileptus morimotoi Ueno, 1955
 Perileptus naraensis Ueno, 1955
 Perileptus pilifer (Jeannel, 1926)
 Perileptus platypterus Jeannel, 1923
 Perileptus promontorii Peringuey, 1896
 Perileptus pusillus Jeannel, 1923
 Perileptus robustus Jeannel, 1923
 Perileptus rutilus Schaum, 1860
 Perileptus shakletoni Jeannel, 1935
 Perileptus sloanei Moore, 1966
 Perileptus stierlini Putzeys, 1870
 Perileptus subopacus Baehr, 1987
 Perileptus testaceus Putzeys, 1870
 Perileptus westralis Moore, 1972
 Perileptus wollastoni Jeannel, 1925

References

Trechinae